Tsogto  Amara (Цогтын Амарбаясгалан, Tsogtyn Amarbayasgalan, born November 20, 1979) is a Lightweight Mongolian Kyokushin kickboxer who has fought in the All Japan Kickboxing Federation, Shoot Boxing, and K-1.

Biography 
Tsogto Amara was born in Darkhan, Mongolia on November 20, 1979. He was first introduced to martial arts in 1994 through some of his friends, which led him to train in Kyokushin Karate. During Amara's amateur career in his home country of Mongolia, he found a great deal of success in karate by winning the 1997 Domestic Kyokushin Championship and 1998 Mongolian National Karate Championship. He then went on to compete in kickboxing after moving to Japan.

Career 

June 18, 2004 in Tokyo, Japan AJKF All Japan Lightweight Tournament 2004 FINAL STAGE, Final, Tsogto Amara defeated Samkor Kiatmontep to win the AJKF All Japan Lightweight Tournament championship via unanimous decision after going into an extra round.

January 4, 2005 in Tokyo, Japan AJKF “SURVIVOR” All Japan Lightweight Championship, Tsogto Amara defeated Satoruvashicoba to win the AJKF Lightweight championship belt via unanimous decision.

Championships and awards 

Kickboxing
All Japan Kickboxing Federation
2004 All Japan Kickboxing Federation AJKF All Japan Lightweight Tournament 2004 FINAL STAGE, Final Champion 
2005 All Japan Kickboxing Federation AJKF Lightweight Champion
KING COMBAT
2002 KING COMBAT 60 kg tournament Champion
Martial Arts Japan Kickboxing Federation
MA Japan Super Featherweight Champion
WPMF
2009 WPMF World Super Lightweight Champion

Karate
Amateur
1997 Domestic Kyokushin Champion 
1998 Mongolian National Karate Champion

Kickboxing record

|- style="background:#fbb;"
| 2018-06-10|| Loss ||align=left|  Takahiro Okuyama || Shoot Boxing 2018 act.3 || Tokyo, Japan || Ext. R Decision (Unanimous) || 3 || 3:00
|- style="background:#cfc;"
| 2018-02-10|| Win ||align=left|  Kentaro Hokuto || Shoot Boxing 2018 act.1 || Tokyo, Japan || Ext. R Decision (Majority) || 4 || 3:00
|- style="background:#fbb;"
| 2009-12-03|| Loss ||align=left| Thonglart|| World Kings Of Muay-Thai Contend for Hegemony - LETS FIGHT II || Hong Kong || Decision || 5 || 3:00
|- style="background:#cfc;"
| 2009-03-29|| Win ||align=left|  Yusuke Sugawara || RISE 53 || Tokyo, Japan || Decision (Unanimous) || 3 || 3:00
|-  style="background:#fbb;"
| 2009-01-18 || Loss ||align=left|  Attachai Fairtex || Muay Lok Japan 2009-The Greatest Muay Thai Festival-  || Tokyo, Japan || Decision (Unanimous) || 5 || 3:00
|- style="background:#cfc;"
| 2008-12-09|| Win ||align=left| Kanpam  || IMPERIAL 〜Teikoku〜 || Mongolia || Decision (Unanimous) || 5 || 3:00
|-
! style=background:white colspan=9 |Wins the WPMF World Super Lightweight title.
|- style="background:#cfc;"
| 2008-06-08|| Win ||align=left|  Shinya Ishige || M-1 Fairtex Singha Beer Muay Thai Challenge "Legend of elbows 2008 ~MIND~" || Tokyo, Japan || TKO (Doctor Stoppage) || 4 || 3:00
|- style="background:#fbb;"
| 2008-02-29|| Loss ||align=left| Yukihiro Komiya || J-NETWORK Let's Kick with J 1st ||  Tokyo, Japan || Decision (Majority) || 3 || 3:00
|- style="background:#fbb;"
| 2007-06-28 || Loss ||align=left|  Taishin Kohiruimaki || K-1 World MAX 2007 Tournament Final Elimination Super Fight || Tokyo, Japan || Decision (Unanimous) || 3 || 3:00
|- style="background:#cfc;"
| 2007-04-04 || Win ||align=left|  Jadamba Narantungalag  || K-1 World MAX 2007 World Championship Final || Tokyo, Japan || Ext. R Decision (Unanimous) || 4 || 3:00
|-  style="background:#fbb;"
| 2007-02-05 || Loss ||align=left|  Buakaw Banchamek || K-1 World MAX 2007 Japan Tournament || Tokyo, Japan || Decision (Unanimous) || 3 || 3:00
|-  style="background:#fbb;"
| 2006-12-22 || Loss ||align=left|  Atapon Fairtex || Lumpinee Stadium || Bangkok, Thailand || Decision (Unanimous) || 5 || 3:00
|- style="background:#fbb;"
| 2006-09-04 || Loss ||align=left|  Jordan Tai || K-1 World MAX 2006 Champions Challenge || Tokyo, Japan || Decision (Unanimous) || 3 || 3:00
|-  style="background:#fbb;"
| 2006-07-07 || Loss ||align=left| Koichi Kikuchi || SHOOT BOXING 2006 NEO ΟΡΘΡΟΖ Series 4th || Tokyo, Japan || Decision (Majority) || 5 || 3:00
|-  style="background:#fbb;"
| 2006-04-05 || Loss ||align=left|  Andy Souwer|| K-1 World MAX 2006 World Tournament Open || Tokyo, Japan || Ext. R Decision (Unanimous) || 4 || 3:00
|- style="background:#cfc;"
| 2006-01-09|| Win ||align=left| Tomo Kiire || J-NETWORK GO! GO! J-NET '06 〜Light my fire!〜 ||  Tokyo, Japan || TKO (Doctor Stoppage) || 5 || 1:19
|- style="background:#cfc;"
| 2005-11-05|| Win ||align=left|  Kim Young Sang || All Japan Kickboxing Federation “Rock'n Roll☆U5 FIGHT☆Hill it!” ||  Tokyo, Japan || KO (Punch) || 3 || 1:19
|- style="background:#cfc;"
| 2005-08-14|| Win ||align=left| Hong Hyung-sik || Martial Arts Japan Kickboxing Federation "DETERMINATION ≪Kesshin≫ 7 KICK GUTS 2005" ||  Tokyo, Japan || Decision (Unanimous) || 3 || 3:00
|- style="background:#cfc;"
| 2005-06-24|| Win ||align=left|  Makoto Nishiyama || Martial Arts Japan Kickboxing Federation "DETERMINATION 5- Battlefield Tiger-" ||  Tokyo, Japan || Decision (Unanimous) || 5 || 3:00
|- style="background:#cfc;"
| 2005-04-17|| Win ||align=left| Mitsumasa Nogawa || All Japan Kickboxing Federation "NEVER GIVE UP" || Tokyo, Japan || Ext. R Decision (Unanimous) || 6 || 3:00
|- style="background:#cfc;"
| 2005-01-04|| Win ||align=left|  Satoruvashicoba || AJKF “SURVIVOR” All Japan Lightweight Championship ||  Tokyo, Japan || Decision (Unanimous) || 5 || 3:00
|-
! style=background:white colspan=9 |Wins the AJKF All Japan Lightweight Championship.
|- style="background:#cfc;"
| 2004-11-19 || Win ||align=left| Ryo Kaito || All Japan Kickboxing FederationThe Championship ||  Tokyo, Japan || TKO (3 Knockdowns) || 3 || 1:55
|- style="background:#cfc;"
| 2004-09-23 || Win ||align=left| Marios Karalis || All Japan Kickboxing FederationDANGER ZONE ||  Tokyo, Japan || KO (Right High Kick) || 3 || 0:13
|- style="background:#cfc;"
| 2004-06-18 || Win ||align=left|  Samkor Kiatmontep || AJKF All Japan Lightweight Tournament 2004 FINAL STAGE, Final||  Tokyo, Japan || Ext.R Decision (Unanimous) || 6 || 3:00
|-
! style=background:white colspan=9 |Wins the AJKF All Japan Lightweight Tournament 2004 Championship.
|- style="background:#cfc;"
| 2004-06-18 || Win ||align=left|  Koji Yoshimoto || AJKF All Japan Lightweight Tournament 2004, Semi-Finals || Tokyo, Japan || Decision (majority) || 5 || 3:00
|- style="background:#cfc;"
| 2004-05-09 || Win ||align=left|  Yuichi Nagumo || Martial Arts Japan Kickboxing Federation "Togane Jim 26th anniversary SUPREME-3 ~Battlefield Tiger~" || Tokyo, Japan || Decision (majority) || 3 || 3:00
|- style="background:#cfc;"
| 2004-04-16 || Win ||align=left|  Masahiro Yamamoto || AJKF All Japan Lightweight Tournament 2004, Quarter Finals || Tokyo, Japan || Decision (majority) || 3 || 3:00
|- style="background:#fbb;"
| 2003-09-27|| Loss|| align=left| Kongpipop Petchyindee || All Japan Kickboxing Federation KNOCK DOWN || Tokyo, Japan || Decision (Unanimous) || 5 || 3:00
|- style="background:#fbb;"
| 2003-05-23|| Loss || align=left|  Haruaki Otsuki || All Japan Kickboxing Federation All Japan Lightweight's Strongest Tournament - Finals || Tokyo, Japan || TKO (Doctor Stoppage, Cut) || 2 || 0:37
|- style="background:#cfc;"
| 2003-05-23|| Win|| align=left|  Satoshi Kobayashi || All Japan Kickboxing Federation All Japan Lightweight's Strongest Tournament - Semi Finals || Tokyo, Japan || Decision (Majority) || 3 || 3:00
|- style="background:#cfc;"
| 2003-03-08 || Win ||align=left|  Yuya Yamamoto || All Japan Kickboxing Federation All Japan Lightweight's Strongest Tournament - 1st Round || Tokyo, Japan || Ext. R Decision (Unanimous) || 5 || 3:00
|- style="background:#cfc;"
| 2002-12-08 || Win ||align=left|  Susumu Daiguji || All Japan Kickboxing Federation "BACK FROM HELL-II" || Tokyo, Japan || KO (Left High Kick) || 2 || 2:34
|- style="background:#cfc;"
| 2002-09-06 || Win ||align=left|  Kuramasa Makoto || All Japan Kickboxing Federation "GOLDEN TRIGGER" || Tokyo, Japan || Decision (Unanimous) || 5 || 3:00
|- style="background:#cfc;"
| 2002-06-16 || Win ||align=left|  Masayuki Sunada || All Japan Kickboxing Federation “Who's Next 02” || Tokyo, Japan || Decision (Unanimous) || 5 || 3:00
|- style="background:#cfc;"
| 2002-04-28 || Win ||align=left|  Maesawa Yoshinori || Martial Arts Japan Kickboxing Federation "In search of the strongest! "Starting and decisive battle"" || Tokyo, Japan || KO (Hook to the Body) || 5 || 2:07
|-
! style=background:white colspan=9 |Wins the MA Japan Super Featherweight Championship.
|- style="background:#cfc;"
| 2002-03-30 || Win ||align=left|  Takahiko Seki ||Martial Arts Japan Kickboxing Federation KING COMBAT-2002-KICK BOXING 60 kg Tournament, Final || Tokyo, Japan || Decision (Unanimous) || 3 || 3:00
|-
! style=background:white colspan=9 |Wins the KING COMBAT 2002 60 kg tournament Championship.
|- style="background:#cfc;"
| 2002-03-30 || Win ||align=left|  Umeshita Yuuki ||Martial Arts Japan Kickboxing Federation KING COMBAT-2002-KICK BOXING 60 kg Tournament, Semi Finals || Tokyo, Japan || KO (Kick to the body) || 3 || 0:38
|- style="background:#cfc;"
| 2002-03-30 || Win ||align=left|  Susumu Daiguji ||Martial Arts Japan Kickboxing Federation KING COMBAT-2002-KICK BOXING 60 kg Tournament, Quarter Finals || Tokyo, Japan || Ext. R Decision (Unanimous) || 3 || 3:00
|- style="background:#cfc;"
| 2002-01-18 || Win ||align=left|  Kazu Kudo ||Martial Arts Japan Kickboxing Federation (Shidokan) "New Year Festival" || Tokyo, Japan || Decision (Unanimous) || 5 || 3:00
|- style="background:#cfc;"
| 2001-11-03 || Win ||align=left|  Tetsunari Amano ||Martial Arts Japan Kickboxing Federation "ADVANCE-1" || Tokyo, Japan || Decision (Unanimous) || 5 || 3:00
|- style="background:#cfc;"
| 2001-09-29 || Win ||align=left|  Kinzo~ ||Martial Arts Japan Kickboxing Federation "ODYSSEY-4" || Tokyo, Japan || Decision (Unanimous) || 4 || 3:00
|- style="background:#cfc;"
| 2001-07-13 || Win ||align=left|  Murosaki Gosho ||Martial Arts Japan Kickboxing Federation "Kick Guts 2001" || Tokyo, Japan || Decision (Unanimous) || 4 || 3:00
|- style="background:#cfc;"
| 2001-06-24 || Win ||align=left|  Yuji Kitano ||Martial Arts Japan Kickboxing Federation "Dream Produce Midday Duel" || Tokyo, Japan || KO || 2 || 1:58
|- style="background:#cfc;"
| 2001-05-20 || Win ||align=left|  Takahiro Masahiro ||Martial Arts Japan Kickboxing Federation “In Search of the Strongest! World Conquest” || Tokyo, Japan || KO || 1 || 1:17
|- style="background:#cfc;"
| 2001-05-04 || Win ||align=left|  Jiro Ikeya ||Martial Arts Japan Kickboxing Federation || Tokyo, Japan || KO || 1 || 1:30
|-
| colspan=9 | Legend:

References

1979 births
Living people
Mongolian male kickboxers
Welterweight kickboxers
Mongolian male karateka
Kyokushin kaikan practitioners
Mongolian expatriate sportspeople in Japan
People from Darkhan-Uul Province